Alice Mary Smith – Clarinet Sonata (1870)

Charles Swinnerton Heap – Clarinet Sonata (1879)

Ebenezer Prout – Clarinet Sonata, Op. 26 (1882) 

Samuel Coleridge-Taylor – Clarinet Sonata (c1893)

William Henry Hadow – Clarinet Sonata (1897)

Arnold Bax – Clarinet Sonata in E major (1901)

Donald Francis Tovey – Clarinet Sonata in B-flat major, Op. 16 (1906)

Charles Villiers Stanford – Clarinet Sonata, Op.129 (1911) 

William Henry Bell – Clarinet Sonata in D minor (1926)

George Frederick Linstead – Clarinet Sonata (1932?)

Arnold Bax – Clarinet Sonata in D major (1934)

Mary Lucas – Clarinet Sonata (1938)

Roger Fiske – Clarinet Sonata (1941)

York Bowen – Clarinet Sonata, Op. 109 (1943)

John Ireland – Fantasy-Sonata (1943)

Herbert Howells – Clarinet Sonata in A (1947) 

Christopher Shaw – Clarinet Sonata (1949)

Malcolm Arnold: Clarinet Sonatina, Op. 29 (1951)

Roger Fiske – Clarinet Sonatina (1951)

Pamela Harrison – Clarinet Sonata (1954)

Iain Hamilton – Clarinet Sonata, Op. 22 (1955) 

Peter Maxwell Davies  – Clarinet Sonata (1956)

Ruth Gipps – Clarinet Sonata (1956)

Arnold Cooke – Clarinet Sonata in B flat (1959)

Alun Hoddinott – Clarinet Sonata (1967)

Derek Bourgeois – Clarinet Sonata (1975)

Timothy Salter – Clarinet Sonata (1976)

Antony Roper (1921–2013) – Clarinet Sonata (1979)

Joseph Horovitz – Clarinet Sonatina (1981)

Graham Whettam – Clarinet Sonata (1988)

Gary Carpenter – Clarinet Sonata (1991)

Adam Gorb – Clarinet Sonata (1991)

Marcus Blunt – Clarinet Sonata (1991)

Michael Finnissy – Clarinet Sonata (2007)

References 

Clarinet sonatas